The Burdea is a left tributary of the river Vedea in Romania. It discharges into the Vedea in Albești.

References

Rivers of Romania
Rivers of Argeș County
Rivers of Teleorman County